Visitors to Georgia must obtain a visa from Georgian diplomatic missions unless they come from one of the visa exempt countries or one of the countries whose citizens can obtain an e-Visa. Visitors must hold a passport (or identity card if an EU, Swiss, Turkish or Ukrainian citizen) valid for the period of intended stay, while Georgian citizens can enter with a valid or expired passport or identity card.

Visa policy map

Visa policy
Georgia adopted a new law of on Legal Status of Alien and Stateless Persons that went into effect on 1 September 2014. It was amended on 9 June 2015 when the maximum allowed stay was extended to one year. The list of countries whose citizens have the right of visa-free entry to Georgia is no longer provided in the new law, it is determined in the separate ordinance of the Government of Georgia. The visa-free list was re-approved on 9 June 2015. Countries that were removed in September 2014, which are Bolivia, Cuba, Dominica, Guatemala, Iraq, Paraguay, Peru, Saint Kitts and Nevis, Saint Lucia, Suriname and Trinidad and Tobago, were not reinstated on the list.

Nationals of the following 94 countries and territories may visit Georgia without a visa for a year (unless otherwise noted):

Visa exemption also applies to:
Georgian diaspora members who are citizens of countries that otherwise require a visa – for stays not exceeding 30 days
United Nations laissez-passer holders for one year
Persons with refugee status in Georgia
Holders of diplomatic or official/service passports of China, Egypt, Guyana, Indonesia, Iran and Peru. 
Holders of valid visas or residence permits of EU/EFTA/GCC countries, overseas territories of EU countries (except Anguilla, Montserrat, Pitcairn, Saint Helena, Ascension and Tristan da Cunha), Australia, Canada, Israel, Japan, New Zealand, South Korea, United Kingdom, or the United States - for stays of max 90 days in a 180-day period. However, there have been many cases where those holding valid residency of GCC countries have been denied access without assigning any reason, especially if they are citizens of India, Pakistan and Palestine.

An agreement with Paraguay on mutual visa-free visits for holders of diplomatic and service passports was signed in September 2016 and is yet to be ratified. Agreement with and Fiji on mutual visa-free visits for holders of ordinary passports were signed in March 2018 and March 2019 and are yet to be ratified

eVisa
Holders of passports of the following 62 countries and territories may obtain a visa online. Alternatively, for certain countries, it is possible to enter Georgia with the visa for one of the visa-free countries. Prior to the pandemic, it was possible get multiple-entry e-Visas online for a fee prior to arrival.

Entry to Abkhazia and South Ossetia

Entering Abkhazia and South Ossetia (considered by Georgia and a major part of the international community to be Russian occupied territories) through border crossing points other than located in Georgia's Zugdidi Municipality and Gori Municipality is an act punishable under Georgian law. However, entering South Ossetia from Georgian government controlled territory is currently impossible.

Kosovo, Palestine, and Taiwan

Visitor statistics
Most visitors arriving to Georgia were from the following countries of nationality (dynamic table including 2014):

External links
 Visa Information for Foreign Citizens
 Georgia Visit Planning Calculator
 Citizens and stateless persons permanently residing in the countries that may enter Georgia without a visa for short-term visit (Not exceeding 90 calendar days in any 180-day period)
 Official Website of Georgia E-visa

See also

Visa policy of South Ossetia
Visa policy of Abkhazia
Visa requirements for Georgian citizens

References

Georgia
Foreign relations of Georgia (country)